Krzysztof Bąk (born 22 June 1982) is a Polish footballer who currently plays for Gedania Gdańsk.

Career
In January 2010, he joined Lechia Gdańsk on a three-year contract deal.

References

External links 
 

1982 births
Footballers from Warsaw
Living people
Polish footballers
Association football defenders
Polonia Warsaw players
Lechia Gdańsk players
Lechia Gdańsk II players
Bytovia Bytów players
Ekstraklasa players
I liga players
II liga players